West Burra is one of the Scalloway Islands, a subgroup of the Shetland Islands in Scotland. It is connected by bridge to East Burra.

Geography
The nearby south-facing sandy beach at Meal is a popular place on a warm day.  At the south end of West Burra is Kettla Ness, with impressive cliff scenery; it is linked to the main island by a shingle and sand tombolo which also provides another attractive sandy beach.  At Duncansclett, a traditional thatched cottage has recently been restored for use by the local history group; the building featured in the BBC television series, 'Restoration'.

West Burra is linked to the Shetland Mainland via Trondra by a series of bridges.

Settlements
Hamnavoe (an extremely common Shetland name) is the main settlement, and there is also Bridge End, so called because it is near the bridge to East Burra.

History
Collins Encyclopedia of Scotland suggests that the name "Burra" is a corruption of "Borgarey" (island of the broch), and while this is unlikely, and no broch is extant, the place name Brough, on West Burra lends some support to this case. However, the form used in the Orkneyinga saga is "Barrey".

The name Papil in the south of West Burra is a Norse reference to the Papar. This name can be found in the form Papyli in several locations in Iceland. However, it is not just Papil's etymology that suggests the site of an early church, confirmation has been found in the form of the "Monk's Stone", which was dug up in Papil and which is now in the Shetland Museum.

The main village of Hamnavoe in the north of West Burra is unique among villages in Shetland, in having been planned and laid out by the factors of the estate, in much the same way as many estate villages created by 'improving' landlords in Scotland; another parallel, albeit on a larger scale, is Ullapool, created by the British Fisheries Society.  The original plan form is still clearly visible, despite the accretion of later development.  Hamnavoe was once an important fishing centre.  Today, none of the larger Shetland fishing boats is likely to be seen here but smaller vessels catch shellfish.  Although full-time fishermen still live in the area, the fishing tradition is nowadays more evident in fish farming; there are several mussel and salmon farms around Burra.

Notable people from West Burra
 Thomas Fraser, a Country and Western musician who was born at Outterabrake and lived much of his life at Setter.

See also

 List of islands of Scotland

Footnotes

Islands of Shetland
Tombolos
Scalloway Islands